Straubinger is a German language habitational surname for someone from Straubing. Notable people with the name include:
 Max Straubinger (1954), German politician
 Sybille Straubinger (1970), Austrian politician

German-language surnames
German toponymic surnames